Babar Khan is a Pakistani TV actor and model. He is best known for his role in Hum TV serial Ek Tamanna Lahasil Si which earned him a nomination for best supporting actor at the 1st Hum awards.

Khan attended Bahria College in Karachi, Pakistan.

Personal life
Khan married Pakistani TV drama actress Sana Khan in December 2013. On 7 March 2014, while traveling to Hyderabad, the couple was involved in a car accident in which Sana Khan died. Babar Khan was taken to hospital and sustained critical injuries. Babar ramazan transmission ary inshallah suffered from depression after the demis of his wife. 
Babar Khan remarried in January 2015 to his cousin, Bisma Khan. The couple have a son and a daughter together.

Television

References

External links 

Pakistani television producers
Living people
Pakistani television directors
Pakistani screenwriters
Pakistani male television actors
Pakistani television writers
Pakistani male models
Male actors from Karachi
Male actors from Lahore
1983 births
Male television writers